Rasulpur  is a village and gram panchayat in the state of Haryana, district Palwal in northern India. It belongs to Gurgaon Division. Village is about 10 kilometres from Palwal City on the Hasanpur road. Village also connected with to Palwal-Aligarh Road.

Demography
Rasulpur Village has a total population of 4373  as per Population Census 2011.

See also

 Bhidauni
 Mandkola

References

External links
 haryana.gov.in

Villages in Palwal district